WDEP (1490 AM) is a radio station broadcasting a News Talk Information format. Licensed to Ponce, Puerto Rico, the station serves the Puerto Rico area.  The station is currently owned by Media Power Group, Inc. and features programming from the Radio Isla Network.

WDEP has been granted an FCC construction permit to move to a new transmitter site, increase day power to 5,800 watts and increase night power to 1,000 watts.

History
The station was assigned the callsign WZBS on 9 March 1973. On 23 June 1997, the station changed its call sign to WLEO, On 18 December 2002, to WZUR, and on 7 January 2003 to the current WDEP.

Ownership
In July 1999, Uno Radio of Ponce Inc., Caguas, P.R. (Jesus M. Soto, chairman), reached an agreement to purchase five radio stations in Puerto Rico from Ponce Broadcasting Corp. (Janero G. Scarano Sr., Julio C. Braum, Luis F. Sala, Catalina Scarano and Sala Business Corp., shareholders) for a reported sale price of $10.75 million.

In June 2003, Media Power Group Inc. (Eduardo Rivero Albino, chairman, Gilberto Rivera Gutierrez, Jose E. Fernandez and Joe Pagan, shareholders) reached an agreement to purchase four AM radio stations in Puerto Rico, including WDEP, from Arso Radio Corp. (Jesus M. Soto, owner) for a reported $6.8 million.

References

External links

News and talk radio stations in Puerto Rico
DEP
Radio stations established in 1973
1973 establishments in Puerto Rico